Brunskill is a surname of English origin. It is of an Anglo-Saxon, Old Norse and Norsemen origin.

Geographical frequency in Britain
At the time of the British Census of 1881, the relative frequency of the surname Brunskill was highest in Westmorland (101.3 times the British average), followed by Cumberland, County Durham, Northumberland, Yorkshire and Lancashire. In all other British counties, its relative frequency was below national average.

People
 Daniel Brunskill - American football player
 George Brunskill (1799-1866), early pioneer in South Australia, who owned much of the land now part of the suburb of Marryatville, South Australia
 John Brunskill - Irish cricketer
 Muriel Brunskill - British contralto
 Norman Brunskill - English footballer
 Ronald Brunskill - English academic authority on vernacular architecture

References

See also
 Brun (disambiguation)

Surnames